Idlicote is a small settlement and civil parish in the English county of Warwickshire, about  north-east of Shipston-on-Stour and  south-east of Stratford-upon-Avon. Population details can be found under Honington. The best known feature is Idlicote House, a grade II listed country house, on a site once owned by St Mary's Abbey. The most notable building is the parish church of Saint James the Great, which has surviving features from the 13th and 14th centuries and a 17th-century chapel added to house tombs of members of the Underhill family of Idlicote. 

Apart from these two, there are several other listed buildings, including Badger's Cottage and Badger's Farm, the Old Rectory, the Whitehouse and Nineveh farmhouses, and the dovecote at Idlicote House. The parish is considered too small for a parish council and instead has a parish meeting. It also forms part of the Brailes ward of the Stratford-on-Avon District. In 1868 The National Gazetteer of Great Britain and Ireland said of Idlicote:

Notable people
Fulke Underhill (1578–1598), of Idlicote House 
Sir Hercules Underhill (1581–1650), of Idlicote House 
Felix Ladbroke (1771–1840), a banker and cricketer, was born here
Geoffrey Howe, Lord Howe, Conservative politician, Chancellor, Foreign Secretary, Peer
Elspeth Howe, Baroness Howe of Idlicote, life peer, the Old Rectory, Idlicote, widow of Geoffrey.

References

External links

Idlicote map at streetmap.co.uk

Villages in Warwickshire